Cheated Hearts is a 1921 American silent drama film directed by Hobart Henley and featuring Herbert Rawlinson, Warner Baxter, Marjorie Daw and Boris Karloff. The screenplay was written by Wallace Clifton, based on the novel Barry Gordon by William Farquar Payson. The film's tagline was "All the Exotic Glamour of the East Woven in a Livid Picture of Love" (Print Ad in the Seattle Star, ((Seattle, Wash.)) 24 December 1921). It was shot in Universal City, and is today considered a lost film.

Plot
Barry Gordon (Herbert Rawlinson) and his brother Tom (Warner Baxter), the sons of an old Virginia colonel, are both in love with Muriel Bekkman (Marjorie Daw). Barry is a wastrel, however, and because he believes Muriel loves Tom the best, he takes to drinking heavily even though his father died of alcoholism. Barry goes to Paris thinking that Tom and Muriel will get married, but then receives word that his brother has been lost in Morocco. He goes to the nearest African village there and learns that his brother is being held captive by natives. He agrees to exchange places with Tom and pay the natives handsomely. Muriel and her father, Nathanial Beekman (Winter Hall), arrive and are overjoyed when Tom is released from captivity, but now they are worried about Barry. Tom, however, is content to wait in the village instead of trying to aid his brother. Finally Barry, having escaped from a cave with the aid of a native girl named Naomi, who is killed helping him. Barry staggers into the village and Muriel, recognizing that he is truly the better man, declares her love for him. Barry decides to swear off drinking and marries Muriel.

Cast
 Herbert Rawlinson as Barry Gordon
 Warner Baxter as Tom Gordon
 Marjorie Daw as Muriel Bekkman
 Doris Pawn as Kitty Van Ness
 Winter Hall as Nathanial Beekman
 Josef Swickard as Colonel Fairfax Gordon
 Murdock MacQuarrie as Ibrahim
 Boris Karloff as Nei Hamid
 Anna Lehr as Naomi, the native girl
 Al MacQuarrie as Hassam
 Hector Sarno (aka Hector Samo) as Achmet

See also
 List of American films of 1921
 Boris Karloff filmography

References

External links

1921 films
1921 drama films
1921 lost films
American silent feature films
American black-and-white films
Films directed by Hobart Henley
Universal Pictures films
Silent American drama films
Lost American films
Lost drama films
1920s American films